The Mountain West Conference men's basketball tournament is held annually to determine the men's basketball champion from the Mountain West Conference. The winner receives an automatic bid to the NCAA Division I Basketball tournament, although they did not in the 1999–2000 season, the conference's first year in existence. The Thomas & Mack Center in Paradise, Nevada has hosted the most tournaments (15), including the last 11 consecutive tournaments.

San Diego State have won the tournament six times, the most of any team. The No. 2 seed has won the tournament eight times, the most of any seed. The lowest seed to win the tournament was Colorado State as a No. 6 seed in 2003.

Results

All-time tournament record by team
Updated through the 2022 Tournament:

^ No longer a Mountain West member.

Source:

See also
 Mountain West Conference women's basketball tournament

References

 
Recurring sporting events established in 2000
2000 establishments in the United States